Howard Cotner (August 10, 1925 – August 8, 2011) was an American politician. He served as a Democratic member for the 52nd district of the Oklahoma House of Representatives.

Life and career 
Cotner was born in Wichita Falls, Texas, the son of Wilma Clare Bodenhamer and Hugh Henry Cotner. He attended the University of Oklahoma.

In 1971, Cotner was elected to represent the 52nd district of the Oklahoma House of Representatives, succeeding Larry Derryberry. He served until 1997, when he was succeeded by David Braddock.

Cotner died in August 2011 at the Comanche County Memorial Hospital in Lawton, Oklahoma, at the age of 85.

References 

1925 births
2011 deaths
People from Wichita Falls, Texas
Democratic Party members of the Oklahoma House of Representatives
20th-century American politicians
20th-century Members of the Oklahoma House of Representatives
University of Oklahoma alumni